Live at the Cactus Cafe is a live album by American singer-songwriter Loudon Wainwright III, released on January 28, 2013 on All Access. Recorded on May 11, 1990, the performance was initially broadcast live on Kut-fm.

At the time of album's performance, seven of its tracks had yet to be released.

Track listing

References

Loudon Wainwright III live albums
2013 live albums